Supercopa can refer to:

Supercopa de España (disambiguation)
Supercopa do Brasil, a Brazilian football (soccer) competition.
Supercopa Honduras, a defunct Honduran football (soccer) competition.
Supercopa de Costa Rica, a Costa Rican Football (soccer) competition.
Copa Master de Supercopa, a defunct South American football (soccer) competition.
Supercopa Libertadores, a defunct South American football (soccer) competition.

fr:Supercoupe
ko:슈퍼컵
zh:超級盃